Levy Bereg is a rural locality (a selo) in Chernigovsky Selsoviet of Arkharinsky District, Amur Oblast, Russia. The population was 1 as of 2018. There is 1 street.

Geography 
Levy Bereg is located on the left bank of the Bureya River, 59 km north of Arkhara (the district's administrative centre) by road. Novobureysky is the nearest rural locality.

References 

Rural localities in Arkharinsky District